"Hello Bitches" is a song by South Korean rapper and singer-songwriter CL, a member of girl group 2NE1. It was released on November 21, 2015, through YG Entertainment as her second solo single. The track was written by CL, along with long-time 2NE1 collaborator Teddy Park, Danny Chung and Jean-Baptiste, with production handled by Park. A choreography music video was uploaded to YouTube in conjunction with the release of the single on November 21.

Background and development
The song, originally a collaboration with British rapper M.I.A., was initially titled "Asian Bitches", but was later renamed to "Hello Bitches" as CL felt that the theme would be limiting. She said: "[the theme] was too categorized...you can't sing along with 'Asian Bitches', you know?" "Hello Bitches" was first released on SoundCloud on November 21, 2015 and was distributed to iTunes on November 25. On December 5, the single was released in South Korea. 

Regarding the release of the song, CL told Noisys Jakob Dorof: "it's not an official single but more of a street single. I wanted to give a little surprise video to excite the fans who have been waiting while I prepare for my solo album. Since I am Korean, it's a good way of presenting me and it's for everyone around the world to see where I am from and to keep it authentic." 

Musically, "Hello Bitches" is as an intense, ferocious and playful hip hop and electronic track that features "tough-talking raps in both English and Korean". It has been described as a song that embodies CL's swag and charisma, featuring instrumentations of synthesizers, a heavy 808 bassline, and a strong trap hip-hop beat as the main axis.

Reception
Christina Lee of Idolator praised the song, writing "it's as assertive as CL has ever sounded, with its schoolyard taunts at the hook and barbs rapped in Korean and English about how she rules the world." Writing for Dazed, Taylor Glasby ranked the song number 12 in their list of The top 20 K-Pop tracks of 2015, writing that "it booms with YG Entertainment's signature Middle Eastern sounds and off-the-scale bass, with CL's commanding presence". Furthermore, Glasby asserted that "it's an aggressive, effective show of strength that no other female K-Pop star could do quite like Chaerin Lee does." Commercially, the song performed moderately in South Korea, peaking at number 21 on the Gaon Digital Chart and number 18 on the component download chart, and sold 238,000 digital units by February 2016.

Music video

A dance performance video for the song was uploaded to 2NE1's official YouTube channel on November 21, 2015. Filmed at WarehouseLA in Los Angeles, it was choreographed and directed by Parris Goebel, who had previously worked with artists such as Justin Bieber, Rihanna, and Nicki Minaj; additionally, she choreographed the songs "Bang Bang Bang" and "Ringa Linga" by YG Entertainment labelmates Big Bang and Taeyang, respectively. The video was filmed in one day and features Goebel and her ReQuest Dance Crew as backup dancers. Andrew Unterberger of Spin praised the video's lively energy and called the choreography impressive.

There was an unreleased music video for the song, which was shown in the Hello Bitches Tour, but was never uploaded online officially.

Live performances
CL performed the song live for the first time at the 2015 Mnet Asian Music Awards in Hong Kong on December 2, along with CL's first solo single "The Baddest Female" (2013) and 2NE1 songs "Fire" (2009) and "I Am the Best" (2011), where she was joined by the rest of the members of 2NE1 as a surprise performance. Following the release of her next single "Lifted" in August 2016, YG Entertainment announced that CL would embark on her first headlining tour, titled the Hello Bitches Tour. The North American tour saw shows in nine cities across the United States and Canada. The tour kicked off on October 29, 2016 at the Hammerstein Ballroom in New York City and concluded at the Sound Academy in Toronto on November 14.

Credits and personnel
Credits adapted from Melon.

Personnel
 Lee Chae-rin – vocals, lyricist
 Teddy Park – lyricist, composer, arranger
 Jean Baptiste – composer, lyricist 
 Danny Chung – lyricist

Charts

Release history

References

2015 singles
YG Entertainment singles
Songs written by Teddy Park
2015 songs